Mixed Reality is the sixth studio album by American alternative rock band Gin Blossoms. It was released on June 15, 2018, on Cleopatra Records.

Recording and release
The band's longtime producer John Hampton died in 2014 and while they toured to promote the 25th anniversary of their most successful album, New Miserable Experience, the band members met Don Dixon at a show in Ohio. They discussed recording together and entered Dixon's recording partner Mitch Easter's studio in October 2016. Vocalist Robin Wilson says that the sessions for the album were "really inspired." The band spent about a year writing songs and doing demos before recording the album. Wilson calls Mixed Reality "sort of a companion" to New Miserable Experience and says, "It feels to me like a record we would have all wanted to make when we were 25."

The band released "Break" as a lead single and followed the release with a tour that was documented on their Chicago date, where they played this album and New Miserable Experience in their entirety.

Track listing
"Break" (Robin Wilson) – 4:00
"Face the Dark" (Wilson) – 4:09
"New Mexico Trouble" (Scott Johnson, Bill Leen) – 4:23
"Angels Fly" (Jesse Valenzuela, Danny Wilde) – 3:51
"Here Again" (Valenzuela, Wilde) – 4:01
"Still Some Room in Heaven" (Johnson, Leen) – 2:58
"Miranda Chicago" (Leen) – 3:52
"Girl on the Side" (Johnson, Kira Brown) – 4:02
"Fortunate Street" (Valenzuela, Wilde) – 3:46
"Wonder" (Valenzuela, Wilde) – 3:56
"Shadow" (Johnson, Wilson) – 3:41
"Forever Is This Night" (Wilson) – 3:13
"The JFK Shit Show" (Johnson, Wilson) – 0:30
"The Devil's Daughter" (Wilson) – 2:23
"Mega Pawn King" (Leen) – 4:49

Personnel
Gin Blossoms
 Scott Hessel – drums, percussion
 Scott "Scotty" Johnson – lead and rhythm guitar, backing vocals
 Bill Leen – bass guitar
 Jesse Valenzuela – rhythm and lead guitar, backing and lead vocals
 Robin Wilson – lead vocals

Technical personnel
Don Dixon – production
Mitch Easter – engineering

References

External links

2018 albums
Albums produced by Don Dixon (musician)
Cleopatra Records albums
Gin Blossoms albums